Silke Abicht (born 7 October 1968) is a German diver. She competed in the 1988 Summer Olympics.

References

1968 births
Living people
Divers from Leipzig
People from Bezirk Leipzig
German female divers
Olympic divers of East Germany
Divers at the 1988 Summer Olympics
20th-century German women